Bernabé González Bueno (c. 1760  c. 1820) was a Spanish politician, who served during the colonial period of Argentina and Paraguay as Minister of the Royal Hacienda of Buenos Aires and Asunción. 

He worked as a public accountant, and beginning his career as a clerk at the Real Hacienda around 1778. He had an active participation in the administration of the Cajas Reales (Royal treasury) until the end of the Viceroyalty of the Río de la Plata.

References

External links 
historia.anasnc.senatics.gov.py

1760s births
1820s deaths
People from Madrid
People from Buenos Aires
Spanish colonial governors and administrators